Eagle Pass Independent School District is a public school district based in Eagle Pass, Texas (USA). The district's boundaries parallel that of Maverick County.

In 2009, the school district was rated "recognized" by the Texas Education Agency.

Schools

High schools
Eagle Pass High School
CC Winn High School

Middle schools
Grades 7-8
Eagle Pass Junior High School
Memorial Junior High School

Elementary schools
Grades 1-6
Benavides Heights Elementary School
Dena Kelso Graves Elementary School
Henry B. Gonzalez Elementary School
Liberty Elementary School
2008 National Blue Ribbon School
Maude Mae Kirchner Elementary School
Nellie Mae Glass Elementary School
Pete Gallego Elementary School
Ray H. Darr Elementary School
Robert E. Lee Elementary School
Rosita Valley Elementary School
Sam Houston Elementary School
San Luis Elementary School 
Seco Mines Elementary School
Stephen F. Austin Elementary School
Graves Elementary School
Grades PK-K
Early Childhood Center
Erna Kennedy Hall Elementary School
Language Development Center
Rosita Valley Literacy Academy

References

External links
 

School districts in Maverick County, Texas